Stefan Lainer (born 27 August 1992) is an Austrian professional footballer who plays as right-back for Bundesliga club Borussia Mönchengladbach and the Austria national team.

Club career

Early career
Lainer started his career with the local club SV Seekirchen. In 2006, he came to Red Bull Salzburg. In 2010, he played his first match for the second team of Red Bull. His next step was SV Grödig, where he played on loan. In 2012, he returned to Salzburg where he was in the squad of FC Liefering, the second team of FC Red Bull Salzburg.

Lainer is the son of Leo Lainer, who played for SV Austria Salzburg and the Austria national football team.

Red Bull Salzburg
On 1 July 2015, Lainer transferred to FC Red Bull Salzburg on a three-year contract for £140,000.

During the 2017–18 season Salzburg had their best ever European campaign. They finished top of their Europa League group for a record fourth time, before beating Real Sociedad, Borussia Dortmund and Lazio, thus making their first ever appearance in the UEFA Europa League semi-final. On 3 May 2018, he played in the Europa League semi-finals as Marseille played out a 1–2 away loss but a 3–2 aggregate win to secure a place in the 2018 UEFA Europa League Final.

International goals

Scores and results list Austria's goal tally first, score column indicates score after each Lainer goal.

Honours
Red Bull Salzburg
Austrian Bundesliga: 2015–16, 2016–17, 2017–18, 2018–19
Austrian Cup: 2015–16,  2016–17, 2018–19

Individual
 UEFA Europa League Squad of the Season: 2017–18
Austrian Bundesliga Team of the Year: 2016–17, 2017–18, 2018–19

References

External links 
 
 

1992 births
Living people
Austrian footballers
Austria international footballers
Austrian Football Bundesliga players
Bundesliga players
FC Liefering players
SV Ried players
SV Grödig players
FC Red Bull Salzburg players
Borussia Mönchengladbach players
Association football defenders
UEFA Euro 2020 players
Austrian expatriate footballers
Austrian expatriate sportspeople in Germany
Expatriate footballers in Germany
Footballers from Salzburg